Lunkerville is a television series dedicated to bass fishing enthusiasts across the US and Canada.  The host, Michael de Avila, referred to on the show simply as "Mike D," travels around the country fishing with local experts learning their secrets for fishing in their favorite spots.

The show was created in 2004 by its host and independent filmmaker, Michael de Avila. In contrast to the many other shows in the genre that rely on a host-as-the-expert format, Lunkerville instead highlights everyday, recreational fishermen traveling to their own secret spots and sharing their techniques. Lunkerville was voted “Favorite Fishing Show” three years in a row by viewers of The Sportsman Channel and awarded a CINE Golden Eagle.

As of 2021, Lunkerville broadcasts on television on the Discovery Channel, the World Fishing Network, and can be streamed on Amazon Prime Video and FishingTV.

External links 
 Lunkerville website
 Discovery Channel Press Release
 World Fishing Network show page
 Fishing TV show page

Fishing television series
2004 American television series debuts